Pseudophoxinus punicus is a species of ray-finned fish in the family Cyprinidae.
It is found only in Tunisia and eastern Algeria.
Its natural habitat is rivers.

References

Pseudophoxinus
Endemic fauna of Tunisia
Fish described in 1920
Taxonomy articles created by Polbot